Carex panicea, commonly known as carnation sedge, is a plant species in the sedge family, Cyperaceae. It is known as grass-like sedge and can be found in Northern and Western Europe, and also in north-eastern North America. Both male and female species leaves are pale blue on both sides.

References

panicea
Flora of Europe
Plants described in 1753
Taxa named by Carl Linnaeus